Athan Karras (September 27, 1927 – February 12, 2010) was a Greek-born American dancer, instructor and actor.

Early life
Karras was born in Thessaloniki, Greece. He came to the United States when he was about 12. He served in the United States Coast Guard. After serving in the Coast Guard, he finished high school and studied theater and dance at New York University. He eventually joined the Greek National Theater and the Parthenon Dancers, one of the premier Greek Folk Dance troops.

Career
In the early 1960s, he founded the Intersection Folk Dance Center in Los Angeles.

For 25 years, Karras taught Greek culture and dance at Loyola Marymount University. He was the U.S. coordinator for Mazoxi, an annual Greek dance conference held on Crete.  He also appeared in about 20 films and television projects, staged a number of Greek-language plays in Los Angeles and produced folklore programs and events throughout North America.

Death
Karras died on February 12, 2010, at Providence Tarzana Medical Center in Tarzana, California, of complications from coronary artery bypass surgery.

See also
International folk dance

References

Sources

External links

Athan Karras papers, 1955-1963, held by the Billy Rose Theatre Division, New York Public Library for the Performing Arts

1927 births
2010 deaths
Folk dancers
Greek male dancers
Loyola Marymount University faculty
Steinhardt School of Culture, Education, and Human Development alumni
Greek emigrants to the United States
United States Coast Guard enlisted